Kaitlyn Greenidge is an American writer. She received a 2017 Whiting Award for Fiction for her debut novel, We Love You, Charlie Freeman. Her second book is a historical novel called Libertie (2021).

Early life and education 
Greenidge was born in Boston, Massachusetts and raised in the neighboring communities of Somerville and Arlington. She and her two sisters were raised by her mother, a social worker, after her parents divorced when she was 7. Greenidge and her sisters were some of the few students of color in their wealthy school district.

Greenidge received her bachelor's degree from Wesleyan University and her MFA from Hunter College.

Career 

Greenidge has written nonfiction for outlets such as Elle.com, Vogue, The New York Times, and the Wall Street Journal. In September 2020 she was hired as the features director for Harper's Bazaar.

Books 
Greenidge's debut novel, We Love You, Charlie Freeman, was released in 2016. It tells the story of an African American family, the Freemans, who adopt a chimpanzee and raise it as a family member for an institutional research project. The book received positive critical reception; it was called "masterful" in a Paste review, and a "vivid and poignant coming-of-age story" by Kirkus. Greenidge received a 2017 Whiting Award for the book.

She received a 2018-2019 fellowship from the Radcliffe Institute, where she worked on "an untitled novel based in part on the life of Susan Smith McKinney Steward, the first black female doctor in New York State." The novel, Libertie, was released by Algonquin in March 2021. In a starred review by Publishers Weekly, the book was called "another genius work of radical historical fiction." Kirkus wrote in a similarly positive review: "Greenidge explores issues that are still real today while also inviting readers into historical moments that will be new to many."

Personal life 
Greenidge resides in central Massachusetts with her daughter (b. 2019).

Accolades 

 2017 - Whiting Award for Fiction (for We Love You, Charlie Freeman)

 2021 -  Guggenheim Fellowship for Fiction

Works

Books 
 We Love You, Charlie Freeman (2016), Algonquin, 
Libertie (2021), Algonquin,

Articles 

 What Walmart Doesn't Get About Juneteenth (2021); The New York Times - Opinion Guest Essay

References

External links 

Official website
Kaitlyn Greenidge on Twitter

Year of birth missing (living people)
Living people
African-American women writers
American essayists
Writers from Boston
21st-century African-American women
21st-century African-American people
Hunter College alumni
American women essayists
Wesleyan University alumni
American women editors